Kiaeria is a genus of chasmataspidid, a group of extinct aquatic arthropods. It was originally classified as a xiphosuran of the monotypic family Kiaeriidae. However, in 2019, the British geologist and paleobiologist James C. Lamsdell assigned the genus to the order Chasmataspidida, possibly being a member of the family Chasmataspididae. Only one species has been assigned to this genus, K. limuloides.

References

Prehistoric chelicerates
Chasmataspidida